Dühlbach is a river of Bavaria, Germany. It flows into the Red Main near Heinersreuth.

See also
List of rivers of Bavaria

References

Rivers of Bavaria
Bayreuth (district)
Rivers of Germany